The Highland County Courthouse is located in Hillsboro, Ohio. The courthouse was placed on the National Register on August 24, 1978. This building has served as the courthouse of Highland County since its opening in 1834 and is the oldest courthouse in continuous use in Ohio.

Gallery

History
Highland County was established in 1805 with special sessions of the courts meeting in New Market. Plans for a courthouse were accepted in 1807, with John Shields having the winning entry. The structure was built in Hillsboro, the new county seat, and was a two-story brick building with a rectangular footprint. Lack of room and foundation problems led the county to plan a replacement.

This replacement was submitted by Pleasant Arthur and was an example of Greek Revival architecture.

Exterior
The red brick structure was originally laid out in a long rectangular plan, but additions on either side were built in 1883. The front of the building has a central entrance with a transom and fanlight above the large wooden double doors. Windows to either side of the door are rectangular in shape and are located within a recessed arch. Above each window and the door are rectangular windows with a lantern hung above the entrance. Ionic columns line the facade and support a pediment. A drum rises from the pitched roof and supports a lantern with arched vents and capped by a small dome. A weathervane tops the tower.

References

Further reading
Thrane, Susan W., County Courthouses of Ohio, Indiana University Press, Indianapolis, Indiana 2000 
Marzulli, Lawrence J., The Development of Ohio's Counties and Their Historic Courthouses, Gray Printing Company, Fostoria, Ohio 1983 
Stebbins, Clair, Ohio's Court Houses, Ohio State Bar Association, Columbus, Ohio 1980

External links

Ohio Travel website

Buildings and structures in Highland County, Ohio
National Register of Historic Places in Highland County, Ohio
County courthouses in Ohio
Courthouses on the National Register of Historic Places in Ohio
Federal architecture in Ohio
Government buildings completed in 1833
U.S. Route 50
U.S. Route 62
1833 establishments in Ohio
Hillsboro, Ohio